Guilty of Love is a  1920 American silent drama film directed by Harley Knoles and written by Rosina Henley who adapted the play by Avery Hopwood. The film stars Dorothy Dalton, Julia Hurley, Henry Carvill, Augusta Anderson, Edward Langford, and Charles Lane. The film was released on August 22, 1920, by Paramount Pictures.

Plot
As described in a film magazine, Thelma Miller (Dalton) becomes the governess in the Florida home of Goddard Townsend (Lane) and is met, loved, betrayed, and deserted by Norris Townsend (Langford), the uncle of the children. Learning that there is to be a child, Norris expects to marry Thelma, but the interference of his father and sister persuade him to approach Thelma with an offer to buy her off. She forces the marriage at the point of a gun and then leaves Florida. Five years later the repentant Norris ends a five-year search when he finds the mother and child in a western town. For the sake of her son Thelma agrees to return to the Florida home, but only as the mother of the child. After a near accident involves the son, Thelma and Norris are reunited in the tenderness of their first love.

Cast
Dorothy Dalton as Thelma Miller
Julia Hurley as Aunt Martha
Henry Carvill as Dr. Wentworth 
Augusta Anderson as Mrs. Watkins
Edward Langford as Norris Townsend
Charles Lane as Goddard Townsend
Douglas Redmond as David
Ivy Ward as Mary
Lawrence Johnson as Bob

Preservation
With no copies located in any film archives, Guilty of Love is a lost film.

References

External links

1920 films
1920s English-language films
Silent American drama films
Lost American films
1920 drama films
Paramount Pictures films
Films directed by Harley Knoles
American black-and-white films
American silent feature films
1920 lost films
Lost drama films
1920s American films